The Society of Heads, formerly the Society of Headmasters & Headmistresses of Independent Schools (SHHIS), or "S of H", is an association of Headmasters and Headmistresses of various types of private schools in the United Kingdom, and was formed in 1961. Members include heads of single-sex and co-educational day and boarding secondary schools, specialist music, dance, and performing arts schools, and special schools for children with learning difficulties. The association's headquarters are in Market Harborough, in Leicestershire, England.

Members of the Society usually have membership of the Association of School and College Leaders, with their schools usually having membership of the Association of Governing Bodies of Independent Schools. Some member girls' schools are also members of the Girls' Schools Association. The Society itself is a constituent of the Independent Schools Council.

Members 

 Abbotsholme School
 Austin Friars
 Battle Abbey School
 Bedales School
 Beechwood Sacred Heart School
 Bournemouth Collegiate School
 Clifton High School
 Cokethorpe School
 Dover College
 Kent College
 Kingham Hill School
 Lincoln Minster School
 Longridge Towers School
 Milton Abbey School
 Newcastle School for Boys
 North Cestrian Grammar School
 Oswestry School
 Our Lady's Abingdon
 Purcell School

 St Augustine's Priory
 St Christopher School
 St David's College
 St Edward's School
 Saint Felix School
 St George's School
 St James Independent Schools
 St John's College, Cardiff
 St John's College, Portsmouth
 St Joseph's College
 Scarborough College
 Shebbear College
 Shiplake College
 Stafford Grammar School
 Tettenhall College
 The National Mathematics and Science College
 Thetford Grammar School
 Windermere School

See also 
 John Dunston, former Chair of SHMIS
 List of Member Schools

References

External links 
 The Society of Heads

Education in Leicestershire
Education-related professional associations
Market Harborough
Organisations based in Leicestershire
Organizations established in 1961
Private school organisations in the United Kingdom
Heads
1961 establishments in England
1961 in education
Teacher associations based in the United Kingdom